Chak Jani is a town and union council of Gujrat District, in the Punjab province of Pakistan. It is part of Kharian Tehsil and is located at 32°36'0N 73°51'0E at an altitude of 222 metres (731 feet).

References

Union councils of Gujrat District
Populated places in Gujrat District